Cogging may refer to:

 Cogging torque, an undesirable component in the operation a motor
 Forge cogging, successive deformation of a bar along its length using an open-die drop forge